This is a list of populated places in the nation state of Solomon Islands, it excludes areas within the Solomon Islands archipelago that fall under a different jurisdiction, such as Bougainville.

Populated places

References

World Gazetteer: Solomon Islands
City Population: Solomon Islands

Solomon Islands

Cities